The 2018 World University American Football Championship was an international college American football tournament that was held from June 16 to June 24, 2018 in Harbin, China, at Harbin University of Commerce Stadium. It was the 3rd World University Championship for American football. The tournament was held in round-robin format, with each team facing each other once.

Teams

Final standings

Matches

References 

World University American Football Championship
2018 in Mexican sports
IFAF
International sports competitions hosted by China
Chinese